was the 44th monarch of Japan, according to the traditional order of succession. Her reign spanned the years 715 through 724.

Genshō was the fifth of eight women to take on the role of empress regnant, and the only one in the history of Japan to have inherited her title from another empress regnant rather than from a male predecessor. The four female monarchs before Genshō were Suiko, Kōgyoku, Jitō and Genmei; the three women sovereigns reigning after her were Kōken, Meishō, and Go-Sakuramachi.

Traditional narrative
Before her ascension to the Chrysanthemum Throne, her personal name (imina) was Hidaka-hime.

Genshō was an elder sister of Emperor Monmu and daughter of Prince Kusakabe and his wife who later became Empress Genmei. Therefore, she was a granddaughter of Emperor Tenmu and Empress Jitō by her father and a granddaughter of Emperor Tenji through her mother.

Events of Genshō's life

Empress Genshō's  succession to the throne was intended as a regency until Prince Obito, the son of her deceased younger brother Monmu, was mature enough to ascend the throne. Obito would later become the Emperor Shōmu.

Obito was appointed Crown Prince in 714 by Empress Genmei. In the next year, 715, Empress Genmei, then in her fifties, abdicated in favor of her daughter Genshō. Obito was then 14 years old.

 715 (Reiki 1, 9th month): In the 7th year of Genmei-tennōs reign (元明天皇七年), the empress abdicated; and the succession (senso) was received by her daughter, who held the throne in trust for her younger brother.  Shortly thereafter, Empress Genshō acceded to the throne (sokui) as Empress Regnant.

Obito remained the crown prince, heir to the new empress. Fujiwara no Fuhito, the most powerful courtier in Genmei's court, remained at his post until his death in 720. After his death, Prince Nagaya, a grandson of Tenmu and the Empress Genshō's cousin, seized power. This power shift was a background for later conflicts between Nagaya and Fuhito's four sons during the reign of Emperor Shōmu (formerly Prince Obito).

Under Genshō's reign, the Nihon Shoki was finished in 720.  This was the first Japanese history book. Organization of the law system known as the ritsuryō was continued under the initiatives of Fuhito until his death. These laws and codes were edited and enacted by Fujiwara no Nakamaro, a grandson of Fuhito, and published as Yōrō ritsuryō under the name of Fuhito. The taxation system which had been introduced by Empress Jitō in the late 7th century began to malfunction. To compensate for the decreased tax revenue, the "Act of possession in three generations", an initiative of Prince Nagaya, was enacted in 723. Under this act, people were allowed to possess a newly cultivated field once every three generations. In the fourth generation, the right of possession would revert to the national government. This act was intended to motivate new cultivation, but it only remained in effect for about 20 years.

Empress Genshō reigned for nine years. Although there were seven other reigning empresses, their successors were most often selected from amongst the males of the paternal Imperial bloodline, which is why some conservative scholars argue that the women's reigns were temporary and that male-only succession tradition must be maintained in the 21st century. Empress Genmei, who was succeeded by her daughter, remains the sole exception to this conventional argument.

In 724, Genshō abdicated in favor of her nephew, who would be known as Emperor Shōmu. Genshō lived for 25 years after she stepped down from the throne. She never married and had no children. She died at age 65.

Empress Genshō's grave is located in Nara.  This empress is traditionally venerated at a memorial Shinto shrine (misasagi), also in Nara.  The Imperial Household Agency has designated this location as Monmu's mausoleum, and has been formally named Nahoyama no nishi no misasagi.  The Imperial tomb can be visited today in Narazaka-chō, Nara City.

Kugyō
 is a collective term for the very few most powerful men attached to the court of the Emperor of Japan in pre-Meiji eras.

In general, this elite group included only three to four men at a time.  These were hereditary courtiers whose experience and background would have brought them to the pinnacle of a life's career.  During Genshō's reign, this apex of the  Daijō-kan included:
 Daijō-daijin (Chi-daijō-kanji 知太政官事), Toneri-shinnō (Prince Toneri) (舎人親王). (9th son of Emperor Tenmu)    720–735
 Sadaijin, Isonokami no Maro (石上麻呂).  708–717
 Udaijin, Fujiwara no Fuhito (藤原不比等).  708–720
 Udaijin, Prince Nagaya (長屋王). 721–724
 Dainagon, Abe no Sukunamaro (阿倍宿奈麻呂). 718–720
 Dainagon, Prince Nagaya (長屋王). 718–721
 Dainagon, Tajihi no Ikemori (多治比池守). 721–730

Eras of Genshō's reign
The years of Genshō's reign are more specifically identified by more than one era name or nengō.
 Reiki (715–717)
 Yōrō (717–724)
 Jinki (724–729)

Genealogy 
Empress Genshō, born Princess Hidaka (氷高皇女), was the eldest child of Empress Genmei and her husband, Crown Prince Kusakabe.She had one younger brother, who was known as Emperor Monnmu, and one younger sister.

Empress Genshō never got married or had children.The throne was inherited by her younger brother's son, Emperor Shōmu.

Ancestry

See also
 Empress of Japan
 Emperor of Japan
 List of emperors of Japan
 Imperial cult

Notes

References
 Brown, Delmer M. and Ichirō Ishida, eds. (1979).  Gukanshō: The Future and the Past. Berkeley: University of California Press. ; 
 Ponsonby-Fane, Richard Arthur Brabazon. (1959).  The Imperial House of Japan. Kyoto: Ponsonby Memorial Society. 
 Titsingh, Isaac. (1834). Nihon Ōdai Ichiran; ou,  Annales des empereurs du Japon.  Paris: Royal Asiatic Society, Oriental Translation Fund of Great Britain and Ireland. 
 Varley, H. Paul. (1980). Jinnō Shōtōki: A Chronicle of Gods and Sovereigns. New York: Columbia University Press. ; 

 
 

Women of medieval Japan
683 births
748 deaths
Japanese empresses regnant
People of Nara-period Japan
7th-century Japanese women
8th-century women rulers
7th-century Japanese people
8th-century Japanese monarchs
8th-century Japanese people
8th-century Japanese women
Daughters of emperors
Daughters of monarchs
Japanese retired emperors